Tyromyces toatoa is a species of poroid fungus found in New Zealand. It was described as a new species by G. H. Cunningham in 1965. The type collections were made by Joan Dingley, who found the fungus in Taupo, Mount Ruapehu, near Whakapapa Stream. The specific epithet toatoa  evokes the Māori name of the host plant.

Description
The fungus is characterized by its dark surface and thin cuticle of the small, effused-reflexed caps. The spores of T. toatoa are more or less sausage-shaped (suballantoid), measuring 4–5 by 1.5–2 µm.

References

toatoa
Fungi of New Zealand
Fungi described in 1965